Cobra is the common name of various snakes, most of which belong to the genus Naja.

Biology
All of the known cobras are venomous and many are capable of rearing upwards and producing a hood when threatened.

Other snakes known as "cobras"
While the members of the genus Naja constitute the true cobras, the name cobra is also applied to these other genera and species:

 The rinkhals, ringhals or ring-necked spitting cobra (Hemachatus haemachatus) so-called for its neck band as well as its habit of rearing upwards and producing a hood when threatened
 The king cobra or hamadryad (Ophiophagus hannah)
 The two species of tree cobras, Goldie's tree cobra (Pseudohaje goldii) and the black tree cobra (Pseudohaje nigra)
 The two species of shield-nosed cobras, the Cape coral snake (Aspidelaps lubricus) and the shield-nosed cobra (Aspidelaps scutatus)
 The two species of black desert cobras or desert black snakes, Walterinnesia aegyptia and Walterinnesia morgani, neither of which rears upwards and produces a hood when threatened
 The eastern coral snake or American cobra (Micrurus fulvius), which also does not rear upwards and produce a hood when threatened

The false water cobra (Hydrodynastes gigas) is the only "cobra" species that is not a member of the Elapidae. It does not rear upwards, produces only a slight flattening of the neck when threatened, and is only mildly venomous.

References

Broad-concept articles
Snakes
Predators